José María Pigrau (born 24 September 1942) is a Spanish former sports shooter. He competed at the 1968, 1976 and the 1984 Summer Olympics.

References

1942 births
Living people
Spanish male sport shooters
Olympic shooters of Spain
Shooters at the 1968 Summer Olympics
Shooters at the 1976 Summer Olympics
Shooters at the 1984 Summer Olympics
Sportspeople from Barcelona
20th-century Spanish people